The Murphy Moose is a Canadian high-wing utility light aircraft produced in kit form by the Chinese-owned Murphy Aircraft of Chilliwack, British Columbia for amateur construction. The Moose can be purchased as a "quick-build" kit which comes partly pre-assembled.

Builders can choose whether to equip their aircraft with the 269 kW (360 hp) Russian-built Vedeneyev M14P nine-cylinder radial or the horizontally-opposed 187 kW (250 hp) Lycoming O-540. Both engines allow the Moose to take off in roughly 180 m (600 ft). At least one owner has equipped their aircraft with a Pratt & Whitney Canada PT6A-20 turboprop engine and another builder has installed a  General Motors LS3 V-8 engine.

Specifications (Moose M-14P- tailwheel undercarriage)

See also

References

 Jackson, Paul. Jane's All The World's Aircraft 2003–2004. Coulsdon, UK: Jane's Information Group, 2003. .

External links 

 

2000s Canadian civil utility aircraft
Homebuilt aircraft
High-wing aircraft
Single-engined tractor aircraft
Moose